Familiar is a play written by Danai Gurira, commissioned by Yale Repertory Theatre.

Productions 
Familiar had its world premiere at Yale Repertory Theatre in New Haven, Connecticut on January 30, 2015. It ran through February 2015. The production was directed by Rebecca Taichman.

The play opened Off-Broadway at Playwright's Horizons as a limited engagement on February 10, 2016 in previews. After receiving critical success, the run was extended and Familiar ran until April 10, 2016. The production at Playwright's Horizons was also directed by Rebecca Taichman.

The play was performed in January–March 2019 at The Old Globe in San Diego, directed by Edward Torres.

Synopsis 
Familiar takes place in the winter of late 2011 at the home of Marvelous and Donald Chinyaramwira in a suburb of Minneapolis, Minnesota. The story focuses on a Zimbabwean family that is preparing for the wedding of their eldest daughter, Tendikayi (addressed as Tendi) who is first generation American. The play opens on Marvelous (often called Marvi by other characters), Donald, and their youngest daughter Nyasha awaiting the arrival of Tendi and her fiance Chris (who is white). We are introduced to Margaret, Marvelous’s youngest sister who comes to join in the pre-wedding festivities. Tendi and Chris arrive along with Anne, Marvelous’s eldest sister, who still lives in Zimbabwe. Tendi and Chris tell Marvelous and Donald that they wish to perform the Roora ceremony (or bride price), a Zimbabwean wedding tradition, and have it facilitated by Anne. This angers Marvelous who wishes to keep the family rooted in American, Christian tradition. The play grapples with African-American identity and tradition and the clashing of ideals.

Characters and Cast

Critical response 
Familiar opened to positive critical reviews for the New York engagement at Playwrights Horizons from the New York Times, and New York Magazine among others.

Charles Isherwood of The New York Times called the play “fiercely funny” and remarked on the production’s contrasting tone to Gurira’s play Eclipsed writing “Although it is just as accomplished, Familiar is a play written in a significantly lighter key, even as it probes with subtlety and smarts the subject of immigration and assimilation — a topic of major currency these days.” He goes on to compliment Gurira and Rebecca Taichman (the director of the production) “Ms. Gurira weaves issues of cultural identity and displacement, generational frictions and other meaty matters into dialogue that flows utterly naturally. Her engaging characters are drawn with sympathy and, under the crisp direction of Rebecca Taichman, Familiar stays firmly on course even as the complications pile up".

Marilyn Stasio of Variety Magazine had contrary thoughts of the play's second act. She wrote “Sorry to say, the warm feelings generated by this open-hearted play turn cold in the second act. Seemingly unsure of where to go with all the plot possibilities she raises, Gurira makes the worst possible choice of darkening the narrative by revealing unbelievable and out-of-character family secrets".

The play received positive reviews for its New Haven production. Of the New Haven production Anita Gates of The New York Times remarks "Familiar is a turn from world politics and international crises toward domestic comic drama, and she [Gurira] makes the transition seamlessly".

Awards and nominations

Off-Broadway production

Publication 
 Gurira, Danai. Familiar. New York Public Library for the Performing Arts Billy Rose Theatre Division, 2016.

References

American plays